Polly Smith (born November 10, 1949), is an American inventor, and costume designer. Smith was a costume designer for The Muppet Show, and Sesame Street. 

In 1977, Smith co-created the "Jogbra", the first sports bra, working alongside Lisa Lindahl and Hinda Miller. She was inducted into the National Inventors Hall of Fame in 2022.

Early life and education 
Polly Palmer Smith was born November 10, 1949 in Montclair, New Jersey. Smith attended Montclair Kimberley Academy. Her mother made quilts and her grandfather was an illustrator. 

She earned a Bachelor of Fine Arts (1971) in fashion design at the Moore College of Art and Design, and a master's degree (1975) in costume design at New York University.

Career 
In 1978, Smith joined The Jim Henson Company. She was a costume designer on The Muppet Show and Sesame Street. Her design for Miss Piggy was featured in an exhibition on Women Designers in the USA. She received 7 Emmy Awards for her work on Sesame Street. 

In 1977, Smith was working with Lisa Lindahl on costumes for the William Shakespeare festival in Burlington, Vermont. Lindahl was a keen athlete, and experienced discomfort when running in a regular bra. Together they came up with the design for a sports bra, and worked with Hinda Miller to source the materials and conduct a test run. When Smith visited New York for work, she returned with new fabrics – elastics and Lycra – and created a bra for Lindahl's measurements. Lindahl and Miller co-founded Jogbra, Inc.

In 1989, she won a British Academy of Film and Television Arts (BAFTA) award for her costume work on the television series The StoryTeller.

When asked about their contributions to the design of the sports bra, Smith commented, “Lisa was the idea, I was the fabrication, and Hinda was the driving force behind making it happen. And this is one of the things we all agreed on — [that] it couldn’t have happened if one of us had been missing — because it needed all three.”

References

External links 
 

1949 births
Living people
20th-century American inventors
Women inventors
Inventors from New Jersey
Montclair Kimberley Academy alumni
People from Montclair, New Jersey
Moore College of Art and Design alumni
New York University alumni
American costume designers
Women costume designers